Chandrapur is a village and gram panchayat in Rajnagar CD Block in Suri Sadar subdivision of Birbhum district in the Indian state of West Bengal.

Geography

Location
Rajnagar, the CD block headquarters, is 11 km away from Chandrapur. Suri, the district headquarters, is 15 km away.

Police station
There is a police station at Chandrapur.

Gram panchayat
Villages in Chandrapur gram panchayat are: Baishnabdaspur, Balarampur, Baraghata, Bhabanandapur, Chaktulsi, Chandrapur, Daldala, Durgapur, Fakirdas, Faridpur, Gamarkunda, Ganeshpur, Haripur, Jamira, Kanaipur, Kanchannagar, Kusmasul, Madhaipur, Monoharpur, Pataldanga, Rajpur, Sajina, Takipur and Tarasol.

Demographics
As per the 2011 Census of India, Chandrapur had a total population of 2,012 of which 1,033 (51%) were males and 979 (49%) were females. Population below 6 years was 211. The total number of literates in Chandrapur was 1,363 (75.68% of the population over 6 years).

Transport
SH 6, running from Rajnagar to Alampur, passes through Chandrapur.

Post Office
Chandrapur has a delivery sub post office, with PIN 731130, under Suri head office. Branch offices with the same PIN are Aligarh, Joypur, Kundira, Kurulmetia, Lauberia, Laujore, Muktipur and Ranigram.

References

Villages in Birbhum district